

Dauntless may refer to:

Military
 Douglas SBD Dauntless, a World War II American naval scout plane and dive bomber
 Operation Dauntess, a military operation part of Operation Courageous
 Operation Martlet (a.k.a. Operation Dauntless), part of a series of British attacks to capture the town of Caen and its environs from German forces

Vessels
 Dauntless (steamboat), a  steamer in the Puget Sound mosquito fleet
 , five ships and one shore establishment of the Royal Navy
 , a United States Coast Guard cutter
 , three ships of the United States Navy
 Dauntless  wooden yacht schooner built in 1866

Fictional
 Dauntless, a fictional sailboat in children's books by James Lennox Kerr
 Dauntless, a fictional starship in The Lost Fleet: Dauntless by John G. Hemry
 HMS Dauntless, a fictional ship-of-the-line from the 2003 American fantasy swashbuckler film Pirates of the Caribbean: The Curse of the Black Pearl
 USS Dauntless (NX-01-A), a fictional starship from the fourth season Star Trek: Voyager episode "Hope and Fear"

Other
 Dauntless (video game), a free-to-play action role-playing video game
 Dauntless: The Battle of Midway, a 2019 American film, directed by Mike Phillips
 Dauntless, one of the five factions in the Divergent novel and film series
 Archibald Dauntless, a fictional hobo portrayed by Lily Tomlin in The Magic School Bus special A Magic School Bus Halloween
 A premium, American-made, wood-fired evaporator manufactured by Smoky Lake Maple Products.
 Callsign of Lynx Air, a Canadian low-cost carrier.